Black God, White Devil (literally, God and the Devil in the Land of the Sun) is a 1964 Brazilian film directed and written by Glauber Rocha. The film stars Othon Bastos, Maurício do Valle, Yoná Magalhães, and Geraldo Del Rey. It belongs to the Cinema Novo movement, addressing the socio-political problems of 1960s Brazil. The film was released on DVD in North America for the first time by Koch-Lorber Films.

Plot

The film starts in the 1940s, during another drought in the sertão, when ranch hand Manoel (Geraldo Del Rey) is fed up with his situation and hopes to buy his own plot of land. His boss tries to cheat him of his earnings and Manoel kills him, fleeing with his wife, Rosa (Yoná Magalhães). Now an outlaw, Manoel travels to the holy site of Monte Santo to join up with a religious cult headed by the self-proclaimed saint Sebastião who condones violence (at one point slaughtering a baby) and preaches disturbing doctrines against the wealthy landowners. All the while, the church and local elites hire a bounty hunter by the name of Antônio das Mortes to take out the group. Before Antônio is able to assassinate Sebastião, Rosa stabs Sebastião, leaving him dead and the two are on the move once again. At this point, the couple end up with a band of cangaceiros also working to take down the government and bosses of the sertão. Antônio is now tasked with assassinating these bandits. He finds head cangaceiros Corisco and Dadá and murders them, leaving Manoel and Rosa alone all again.

And so it goes, the two running from one allegiance to another, following the words of others as they attempt to find a place in their ruthless land. Blending mysticism, religion, and popular culture in this symbolic and realistic drama, Rocha insists that rather than follow the external and obscure dogmas of culture and religion, man must determine his path by his own voice.

Cast
 Geraldo Del Rey as Manoel
 Yoná Magalhães as Rosa
 Othon Bastos as Corisco
 Maurício do Valle as Antonio das Mortes
 Lidio Silva as Sebastião
 Sonia Dos Humildes as Dadá
 João Gama as Priest
 Antônio Pinto as Colonel
 Milton Rosa as Moraes as Milton Roda
 Roque Santos as Roque

Production

Glauber Rocha was 25 years old when he wrote and began to direct the film.

Its filming took place on Monte Santo and Canudos, Bahia lasting from June 18, 1963 to September 2, 1963.

In the scene where we see Manoel (Geraldo Del Rey) carrying a huge stone over his head while climbing Monte Santo on his knees, Del Rey insisted on carrying a real stone that weighted over 20 kilos - something that worried Rocha. After the shooting, Del Rey had to take 2 days off, due to fatigue.

During the dubbing of the sound, Othon Bastos performed three voices. Besides dubbing himself as Corisco, he performed the voice for Lampião (whom Corisco had "incorporated") and also dubbed Sebastião, the black God, even though Lídio Silva played the character on screen.

Reception

Critical reception

A. H. Weiler from The New York Times praised the film, calling it "Simple, black-and-white, more arresting as a shocking polemic than as memorable drama." Ted Shen from The Chicago Reader wrote, "The fusion of European and Afro-Brazilian elements--dialogue, exquisite black-and-white images, and music by Villa-Lobos--is startlingly original and poetical in conveying the hope and despair of the oppressed." Time Out Magazine praised the film's style as being "somewhere between folk ballad and contemporary myth, since the references to Brazilian history and culture are pervasive and fairly opaque to the uninitiated".

Awards
The film was nominated for the Palme d'Or at the 1964 Cannes Film Festival, but failed to win. It was also selected as the Brazilian entry for the Best Foreign Language Film at the 37th Academy Awards, but was not accepted as a nominee. In 2015 it was voted number 2 on the Abraccine Top 100 Brazilian films list.

See also
 List of submissions to the 37th Academy Awards for Best Foreign Language Film
 List of Brazilian submissions for the Academy Award for Best Foreign Language Film

References

External links
 
 
 

1964 films
1964 crime drama films
Brazilian crime drama films
Brazilian black-and-white films
Films directed by Glauber Rocha
Films set in Brazil
Films set in the 1940s
Films shot in Bahia
1960s Portuguese-language films
Films about cangaço